John Mannion is an American politician. A Democrat, he is currently a member of the New York State Senate representing the 50th district. He was first elected in 2020. Prior to becoming a state senator, Mannion was a biology teacher. Mannion was elected to the 50th district of the New York State Senate in 2020, defeating Republican Angi Renna and becoming the first Democrat to hold the seat in more than 50 years.

Background 
Mannion was born and raised on Tipperary Hill in Syracuse. He is a lifelong Central New Yorker and the grandchild of Irish immigrants. He currently resides in Geddes with his family. Mannion received his Bachelor’s degree in Biology from Binghamton University and later attended SUNY Oswego to earn his Master’s of Science and Secondary Science Education. After completing his education, Mannion spent nearly three decades teaching in public schools. He spent twenty-one of those years teaching Advanced Placement Biology in the West Genesee Central School District, where he also served as President of the West Genesee Teachers' Association. In 2018, Mannion ran for New York State Senator in New York’s 50th district and was narrowly defeated by incumbent Republican Bob Antonacci. In 2020, he ran for the seat again and won with 52.57% of the vote over Republican Angi Renna.

Electoral history

2018

2020

2022 
2022 was a hotly contested year for the 50th Senate district. Due to newly drawn district maps and losing much of the territory, John Mannion was seen to lose. On election night, before counting the absentee ballots, Rebecca Shiroff lead by 396 votes. After many recounts John Mannion had been certified the winner by New York State Supreme Court Justice Scott Delconte. John Mannion had won the election by 10 votes, making it the closest race in the 2022 New York State Senate elections.

New York State Senate

Disability rights 
During the 2022 session, Mannion sponsored legislation that establishes a living allowance for adults with developmental disabilities and another bill that creates a public awareness campaign to combat stigmas about developmental disability and increases flexibility for those with disabilities to make decisions about their guardianships. Both bills were signed into law.

Fiscal policy 
In April 2022, Mannion voted for a $220 billion spending plan which implemented tax cuts for the middle class.

Flood mitigation 
In May 2021, Mannion sponsored legislation extending the effectiveness of the Upstate Flood Mitigation Task Force until July 1, 2023. This legislation has been signed into law.

Manufacturing 
Mannion is the prime co-sponsor of the Green CHIPS Legislation in an effort to get a factory for making computer chips built in White Pine Commerce Park in Onondaga County. This legislation has been signed into law by Governor Kathy Hochul. Since the bill was signed into law, Micron, a semiconductor manufacturing company, has pledged $100 billion to have the facility built in Clay, NY.

Committee assignments
As State Senator, Mannion is the first ever Chairperson of the Committee on Disabilities. He also serves as a member on the following committees:
 The Committee on Children and Families
 The Committee on Civil Service and Pensions
 The Committee on Education
 The Committee on Environmental Conservation
 The Committee on Housing, Construction and Community Development
 The Committee on Internet and Technology

References

Democratic Party New York (state) state senators
Living people
1968 births